Kerintha is a 2015 Indian Telugu-language romantic comedy film directed by Sai Kiran Adivi. This film is produced by Dil Raju under the banner Sri Venkateswara Creations. It stars Sumanth Ashwin, Viswant, Sri Divya, Sukrithi, Tejaswi Madivada, and Parvateesam in main roles. The film was released on 12 June 2015.

Plot
Jai, Siddharth and Bhavana are childhood friends who study in the same college. They are joined by Nookaraju and Priya in the college. Soon they become a batch of cool buddies. As Nookaraju alias Nooks is a farmer's son from a village near Srikakulam, life in college turns out to be a culture shock for him and he finds it difficult to cope with studies. Bhavana comes to his rescue and they become thickest pals of all. Meanwhile, Sid falls in love with Priya the minute he sets eyes on her. He proposes to her with the help of friends and the touching way in which he proposes floors her, and she instantly accepts his love. Priya being a rich child, she showers gifts on Sid. She also pesters him saying she wants to meet his mother. But Sid, who is afraid of his strict mother, a principal of another college keeps postponing. Moreover, he also hidden the fact that he is doing music course instead of Mca course. Meanwhile, Jai rejects proposal from his classmate Tanisha revealing that he had fallen for a girl at first sight in a bus, but doesn't know her whereabouts and his only clue is the girl's lost Jumki (earring). He starts to search for her and finally tracks her with his intelligence. Manasvini is a career-oriented doctor who thinks relationships are hurdles in achieving her goals. She aspires to make it big by going for higher studies in Australia. Jai has super cool parents who support his love. While Jai tries to woo Manasvini, she keeps avoiding him. Jai is an optimistic, all is well type of guy who goes by his heart. He solves other people's problems and love issues and spreads happiness around. Everyone feels and says that he spells magic in their lives and even Manaswini likes him when he helped to sort out things in her friend Sonia's marriage.

Things take a U-turn when they face the harsh realities of their respective lives. Priya plans a great birthday surprise for Sid in a mall and while everything is going smoothly Sid finds his Mom in the mall and when Priya finally wishes him he ignores her saying that he doesn't know her. Priya is completely shell shocked and though Sid tries to reason with her later she refuses and asks him to first muster enough courage to speak to his mom. Jai, too, goes through bad luck as Manaswini thinks that love will distract her and she is planning for higher studies in Australia and thus can't say yes to Jai. Jai ultimately bids her goodbye and continues his life with a hope she will come back.

In the case of Nooks, he falls in a trap on online crime by befriending a fake girl account on Facebook mistaking her to be his classmate Shalini and transfers his father's hard-earned money into her account. Bhavana tries to warn him but he shouts at her making her angry and distancing herself from him. Later understands that he's been cheated and tries to harass Shalini under the influence of alcohol. Shalini files a police complaint and his friends come to his rescue. He then learns the value of friendship through Jai's words. After realising his mistake he asks Bhavana to accept his apologies but she refuses.

Sid on other hand patches with Priya by saying that he has spoken to his mother and she has accepted Priya and wants her to meet the following week. In the turn of events Priya finds Sid's mother shopping in the mall and she approaches her but Sid's mother just says she doesn't know Priya and Sid's has not made any mention of her. Priya finally confronts Sid and says that she cannot tolerate any more lies and is leaving India permanently. Nooks, on the other hand, learns that Bhavana is leaving to her hometown. Jai encourages both Sid and Nooks to open up their hearts and console their loved ones without having to lose them.

Nooks reaches to bus stand and opens up his feelings to Bhavana to which she reacts positively. Mustering enough courage, Sid takes his mother to airport and says that he loves Priya and want to marry her. He also reveals about his music course. Angry at first Sid's mother agree to it and asks Priya to help her contacting her parents. In the end, it is shown Bhavana is speaking to Nooks' parents (they are married) and going to attend a marriage of Jai. At the registrar's office, Manaswini turns up along with Sonia and confesses to Jai that she loves him and wants to marry him. But it turns out to be marriage of Sid and Priya. Now nooks explains the actual story that he learned that Manaswini still loves Jai through Sonia and he wanted her to open up so he lied to Manaswini that Jai is marrying Tanisha. This with uniting couples the movie ends on happy note.

Cast

 Sumanth Ashwin as Jai 
 Sri Divya as Manaswini
 Sukrithi as Bhavana
 Viswant as Siddharth
 Tejaswi Madivada as Priya
 Uppada Parvateesam as Nookaraju
 Priyanka Naidu as Sonia
 Pragathi as Siddharth's mother
 Priya as Sonia's mother
 Sameer as Sonia's father
 Nithya Naresh as Tanisha
 Anitha Chowdary as Jai's mother
 Jeedigunta Sridhar as Jai's father
 Shankar Melkote as Church father
 Kedar Shankara as Siddharth's father
 Usha Sri as Siddharth's sister
 Allu Ramesh as Nookaraju's father
 Jessie as Shalini

Production
After producing big-budget movies like Seethamma Vakitlo Sirimalle Chettu, Ramayya Vasthavayya, Yevadu and working with superstars like Venkatesh & Mahesh Babu, Jr. NTR and Ram Charan, Dil Raju announced that he will be producing a low-budget movie with new actors under the direction of Sai Kiran Adivi.

Soundtrack
The audio was released on 25 May 2015.Allu Aravind Attended as chief guest and launched the audio CD of Kerintha. The music was composed by Mickey J. Meyer and Released on Aditya Music.

Release
The movie was released worldwide on 12 June 2015.

Awards
Parvatheesam was nominated for Best Male Debut in Telugu at 5th South Indian International Movie Awards.

References

2015 films
2010s Telugu-language films
Indian buddy drama films
Films about friendship
Indian romantic drama films
Indian coming-of-age drama films
2010s buddy drama films
2010s coming-of-age drama films
2015 romantic drama films
Sri Venkateswara Creations films
Films directed by Sai Kiran Adivi